Aruküla may refer to several places in Estonia:

Aruküla, small borough in Raasiku Parish, Harju County
Aruküla, Hiiu County, village in Pühalepa Parish, Hiiu County
Aruküla, Mäetaguse Parish, village in Mäetaguse Parish, Ida-Viru County
Aruküla, Maidla Parish, village in Maidla Parish, Ida-Viru County
Aruküla, Järva County, village in Koeru Parish, Järva County
Aruküla, Lääne County, village in Lihula Parish, Lääne County
Aruküla, Lääne-Viru County, village in Vinni Parish, Lääne-Viru County
Aruküla, Pärnu County, village in Varbla Parish, Pärnu County
Aruküla, Rapla County, village in Märjamaa Parish, Rapla County